Khalaj may refer to:
 Khalaj language
 Khalaj people
 Khalji dynasty, a Muslim dynasty which ruled large parts of South Asia between 1290 and 1320
 Khalaj, Afghanistan, in Helmand Province
 Khalaj, Armenia
 Khalaj, Iran (disambiguation)
Xələc, Nakhchivan (Khaladj, Khalaj)

Language and nationality disambiguation pages